The following are the national records in athletics in Trinidad and Tobago maintained by the National Association of Athletics Administrations of Trinidad & Tobago (NAAATT).

Outdoor
Key to tables:

+ = en route to a longer distance

h = hand timing

w = windy conditions (>2.0 m/s, <4.0 m/s )

A = affected by altitude

y = denotes one mile

OT = oversized track (> 200m in circumference)

Men

Women

Indoor

Men

Women

Notes

References
General
Trinidad and Tobago Outdoor Records 30 November 2021 updated
Specific

External links
 NAAATT web site

Trinidad and Tobago
Records
Athletics
Athletics